Notturno is the Italian word for nocturne. It may refer to:

Film
 Tango notturno, a 1937 German film
 Notturno (film), a 2020 Italian-French-German documentary

Music
 Euroclassic Notturno, classical music recordings assembled by BBC Radio used in overnight classical-music schedules
 Notturno, Op. 42, for viola and piano, by Beethoven; see List of compositions by Ludwig van Beethoven
 "Notturno" for string quartet (1993), see List of compositions by Luciano Berio
 "Notturno", Op. 8, for flute, violin, viola, cello, piano and two horns, by Prince Louis Ferdinand of Prussia (1772–1806)
 "Notturno", several pieces; see List of compositions by Ottorino Respighi
 Notturno (Schoeck), a 1933 song cycle for baritone and string quartet by Othmar Schoeck
 Notturno (Schubert), an 1827 composition for piano trio by Franz Schubert
 Notturno (Strauss), an 1899 song for low voice and orchestra by Richard Strauss
 Notturno Concertante, an Italian neo-progressive rock band established in 1984
 Torneo notturno, a 1931 opera by Italian composer Gian Francesco Malipiero
 "Notturno", the third movement of String Quartet No. 2 (Borodin); the origin of the melody of "And This Is My Beloved" from the 1953 musical Kismet

See also
 
 Nocturne (disambiguation)